Shoaib Ahmed (born 19 November 1987) is an Indian former cricketer. He played thirteen first-class matches for Hyderabad between 2007 and 2009.

See also
 List of Hyderabad cricketers

References

External links
 

1987 births
Living people
Indian cricketers
Hyderabad cricketers
Cricketers from Hyderabad, India
Deccan Chargers cricketers